A Cabana do Pai Tomás is a Brazilian telenovela produced and broadcast by TV Globo. It is based on Harriet Beecher Stowe's Uncle Tom's Cabin. It premiered on 7 July 1969 and ended on 28 February 1970, with a total of 205 episodes. It was the sixth "novela das sete" to be aired at the timeslot. It was created by Hedy Maia, Glória Magadan, Walther Negrão and directed by Fábio Sabag.

Cast

References

External links 
 

TV Globo telenovelas
1969 telenovelas
Brazilian telenovelas
1969 Brazilian television series debuts
1970 Brazilian television series endings
Portuguese-language telenovelas
Television series based on novels